The Dutch Eerste Divisie in the 1970–71 season was contested by 16 teams. FC Den Bosch won the championship. Due to the disbandment of the Tweede Divisie at the end of this season, there was no relegation.

New entrants
Promoted from the 1969–70 Tweede Divisie:
 sc Heerenveen
 FC Wageningen
Relegated from the 1969–70 Eredivisie:
 GVAV
 SVV

League standings

See also
1970–71 Eredivisie
1970–71 Tweede Divisie
1970–71 KNVB Cup

References
Netherlands - List of final tables (RSSSF)

Eerste Divisie seasons
2
Neth